Lycée Maximilien Perret is a comprehensive senior high school/sixth-form college in Alfortville, Val-de-Marne, France, in the Paris metropolitan area. It has general and vocational education

It opened in 1997.

References

External links
 Lycée Maximilien Perret 

Lycées in Val-de-Marne
1997 establishments in France
Educational institutions established in 1997